The Museo Interactivo Kaná or El Museo de Ciencia y Tecnología Kaná formerly the Museo Interactivo de Xalapa is a modern interactive museum in the city of Xalapa, in the state of Veracruz in eastern Mexico.
The museum closed at the end of 2018 due to financial troubles, but subsequently reopened under the Kana branding.

The museum features a planetarium with an IMAX screen, showing educational documentaries.

References

External links

Xalapa
Museums in Veracruz
Science museums in Mexico
Planetaria in Mexico
IMAX venues